Igor Viktorovich Sanakoyev (Sanaqotê Viktorê fêrt Igor; ; born 20 February 1946 in Aspindza, Georgian SSR, Soviet Union) is an Ossetian politician a former Prime Minister of the Republic of South Ossetia, from 18 September 2003 until 1 May 2005. 

Sanakoyev graduated from the Moscow Institute of Food Industry in 1984 and worked at various food processing enterprises in Tskhinvali and in North Ossetia. From 1998 until his appointment as Prime Minister, he worked at the North Ossetian branch of the Russian customs.

Sanakoyev is married and has a son.

References

1946 births
Living people
People from Samtskhe–Javakheti
Prime Ministers of South Ossetia